Abdelkrim "Krimo" Laribi (15 December 1943 – 23 September 1995) was a former Algerian footballer who played as a goalkeeper for the Algeria national team. He was a member of Algeria's team at the 1968 African Cup of Nations in Ethiopia. Laribi had 5 caps for the Algeria national team between 1967 and 1968.

References

External links
 

1943 births
1995 deaths
Competitors at the 1967 Mediterranean Games
1968 African Cup of Nations players
Algeria international footballers
Algerian footballers
JSM Tiaret players
People from Tiaret
Association football goalkeepers
Mediterranean Games competitors for Algeria
20th-century Algerian people